Sem Westerveld (born 18 July 2002) is a Spanish professional footballer who plays as a goalkeeper for Dutch club AZ Alkmaar.

Career
Westerveld made his professional debut with Jong AZ in a 1–0 Eerste Divisie loss to Roda on 4 January 2021. On 18 June 2021, he signed his first professional contract with AZ Alkmaar for three years.

Personal life
Westerveld's father Sander Westerveld and grandfather Hennie Ardesch were also professional football goalkeepers. Sem was born in San Sebastián, Spain while his father was playing for Real Sociedad.

References

External links
 Career stats - Voetbal International
 

2002 births
Living people
Spanish people of Dutch descent
Spanish footballers
Dutch footballers
Footballers from San Sebastián
Association football goalkeepers
Eerste Divisie players
Jong AZ players